{{DISPLAYTITLE:C40H44N4O16}}
The molecular formula C40H44N4O16 (molar mass: 836.79 g/mol, exact mass: 836.275231 u) may refer to:

 Uroporphyrinogen I
 Uroporphyrinogen III

Molecular formulas